Dark Nature may refer to:

 Dark Nature (2009 film), British film
 Dark Nature (2022 film), Canadian film